= Alexandre Troffa =

French footballer (born 2000)

Personal information
- Full name: Alexandre Troffa
- Date of birth: 6 May 2000 (age 26)
- Place of birth: Ajaccio, France
- Height: 1.82 m (6 ft 0 in)
- Position: Right-back

Team information
- Current team: Bocognano Gravona

Youth career
- 2015–2017: Bastia
- 2017–2018: Gazélec Ajaccio

Senior career*
Years	Team	Apps	(Gls)
2018–2020	Gazélec Ajaccio	2	(0)
2020–2021	AC Ajaccio B	2	(0)
2022–	Bocognano Gravona		
- * Club domestic league appearances and goals as of 21:53, 1 January 2021 (UTC)

Alexandre Troffa (born 6 May 2000) is a French footballer who plays as a right-back for SC Bocognano Gravona.

== Professional career ==
Troffa spent two years in the academy of SC Bastia, but after the club's financial difficulties transferred to his hometown club Gazélec Ajaccio. He made his professional debut for Gazélec Ajaccio in a 2–0 Ligue 2 win over Nîmes Olympique on 23 January 2018.

In the summer 2020, Troffe moved to AC Ajaccio, where he was registered for the club's B-team in the Championnat National 3. In August 2022, Troffa joined SC Bocognano Gravona.
